Jean-Julien Rojer and Horia Tecău were the defending champions, but lost in the semifinals to Philipp Petzschner and Alexander Peya.
Nicolas Mahut and Vasek Pospisil won the title, defeating Petzschner and Peya in the final, 7–6(7–2), 6–4.

Seeds

Draw

Draw

Qualifying

Seeds

Qualifiers
  Marin Draganja /  Lukáš Rosol

Qualifying draw

References
 Main Draw
 Qualifying Draw

ABN AMRO World Tennis Tournament - Doubles
2016 ABN AMRO World Tennis Tournament